The Ministry of Economy is a Portuguese government ministry.

Portugal
Economy